George Henry Remnant (20 November 1846 – 24 February 1941) was an English first-class cricketer active 1868–78 who played for Kent. He was born and died in Rochester.

References

1846 births
1941 deaths
English cricketers
Kent cricketers